Colin Harrison (10 May 1928 – 16 April 2017) was an Australian cricketer. He played in four first-class matches for South Australia in 1966/67.

See also
 List of South Australian representative cricketers

References

External links
 

1928 births
2017 deaths
Australian cricketers
South Australia cricketers
Cricketers from Adelaide